A. J. Johnson may refer to:

A. J. Johnson (cornerback) (born 1967), American football cornerback
Adrienne-Joi Johnson (born 1963), American actress and dancer, sometimes credited as A. J. Johnson
Anthony Johnson (actor) (1966-2021), American film actor, sometimes credited as A. J. Johnson
A. J. Johnson (linebacker) (born 1991), American football linebacker
Alvin J. Johnson (1827-1884), American publisher, also known as AJ Johnson
A. J. Johnson (bowler)